The 2010 Swiss Open Super Series is a top level badminton competition which will be held from March 16, 2010 to March 21, 2010 in Basel, Switzerland. It is the fourth BWF Super Series competition on the 2010 BWF Super Series schedule. The total purse for the event is $200,000. St. Jakobshalle was host the competition. This was the 20th anniversary of the swiss Open tournament, since the tournament was held in St. Jakobshalle and entered the high-level World Badminton Grand Prix event in 1991.

Men's singles

Seeds
 Lee Chong Wei
 Lin Dan
 Chen Jin
 Taufik Hidayat
 Peter Gade
 Jan Ø. Jørgensen
 Nguyễn Tiến Minh
 Chen Long

Results

Women's singles

Seeds
 Wang Yihan
 Jiang Yanjiao
 Pi Hongyan
 Lu Lan
 Zhou Mi
 Wang Shixian
 Tine Rasmussen
 Juliane Schenk

Results

Men's doubles

Seeds
 Koo Kien Keat / Tan Boon Heong
 Jung Jae-sung / Lee Yong-dae
 Markis Kido / Hendra Setiawan
 Mathias Boe / Carsten Mogensen
 Alvent Yulianto / Hendra Aprida Gunawan
 Guo Zhendong / Xu Chen
 Howard Bach / Tony Gunawan
 Lars Paaske / Jonas Rasmussen

Results

Women's doubles

Seeds
 Chin Eei Hui / Wong Pei Tty
 Mizuki Fujii / Reika Kakiiwa
 Cheng Wen-hsing / Chien Yu-chin
 Petya Nedelcheva / Anastasia Russkikh
 Miyuki Maeda / Satoko Suetsuna
 Du Jing / Pan Pan
 Tian Qing / Yu Yang
 Ha Jung-eun / Lee Kyung-won

Results

Mixed doubles

Seeds
 Zheng Bo / Ma Jin
 Lee Yong-dae / Lee Hyo-jung
 Thomas Laybourn / Kamilla Rytter Juhl
 Joachim Fischer Nielsen / Christinna Pedersen
 Tao Jiaming / Zhang Yawen
 Diju V. / Jwala Gutta
 Robert Mateusiak / Nadieżda Kostiuczyk
 Ko Sung-hyun / Ha Jung-eun

Results

References

External links
Swiss Super Series 2010 at tournamentsoftware.com

Swiss Open (badminton)
2010 in Swiss sport
Swiss Open